Miejski Klub Sportowy Trzebinia-Siersza is a Polish football club based in Trzebinia, Poland. MKS Trzebinia-Siersza currently plays in the Polish III. Liga.

Current squad

See also 
 Football in Poland

References

External links
 Official website
 MKS Trzebinia-Siersza on futbolowo.pl

Football clubs in Poland
Association football clubs established in 2000
2000 establishments in Poland
Chrzanów County
Football clubs in Lesser Poland Voivodeship